William "Bill" Andres, Jr. (August 2, 1925 – September 23, 2010) was a Canadian politician and farmer. He was elected to the House of Commons of Canada in the 1974 election as a member of the Liberal Party to represent the Ontario riding of Lincoln. He served as Parliamentary Secretary to the Minister of State (Multiculturalism) between 1977 and 1979. He was also a member of various standing committees. Due to re-distribution, he ran in St. Catharines riding in the 1979 election and was defeated. He ran in Niagara Falls as a candidate for the Christian Heritage Party of Canada in the 1988 federal election and was also defeated.

External links 

1925 births
Canadian farmers
Liberal Party of Canada MPs
Members of the House of Commons of Canada from Ontario
Ukrainian emigrants to Canada
2010 deaths
Christian Heritage Party of Canada politicians